Tapuruquara Airport  is the airport serving Santa Isabel do Rio Negro, Brazil. The name Tapuruquara is the original name of the Municipality, which the airport officially retained.

Airlines and destinations

Access

See also

List of airports in Brazil

References

External links

Airports in Amazonas (Brazilian state)